Sir Robert Newton Anderson (8 December 1871 – 23 May 1948) was a unionist politician in Ireland.

Born in County Fermanagh, Anderson ran a company making hosiery in Derry. He became active in the Irish Unionist Party and was elected as Mayor of Derry, serving from 1915 until 1919.  After the partition of Ireland, he was elected to the Parliament of Northern Ireland representing Londonderry, serving from 1921 until the seat's abolition in 1929.  He also served on the Irish Convention as the Deputy Lieutenant for the City of Derry.

Anderson was knighted in the 1918 New Year Honours, and appointed to the Privy Council of Northern Ireland in 1927.  His son, Albert, followed him into politics.

References

1871 births
1948 deaths
Deputy Lieutenants in Northern Ireland
Mayors of Derry
Members of the Privy Council of Northern Ireland
People from County Fermanagh
Ulster Unionist Party members of the House of Commons of Northern Ireland
Knights Bachelor
Politicians awarded knighthoods
Members of the House of Commons of Northern Ireland for County Londonderry constituencies
Ulster Unionist Party councillors